Haselhorst is a station on the Berlin U-Bahn line U7. It was opened on 1 October 1984 with the line's extension from Rohrdamm to Rathaus Spandau. Its name means "hazel eyrie" in English; it was named for the locality where it lies: Haselhorst in the borough of Spandau. It lies between the stations Zitadelle and Paulsternstraße.
It was built by R.G.Rümmler, mentionable are interesting light effects on the ceiling. The next station is Paulsternstraße.

References

External links

U7 (Berlin U-Bahn) stations
Buildings and structures in Spandau
Railway stations in Germany opened in 1984